We Want Moore! is a live album by Northern Irish guitarist Gary Moore, released in October 1984.

Track listing

Personnel
Gary Moore – lead vocals, lead guitar, producer, backing vocals on 2
Neil Carter – keyboards, rhythm guitar, backing vocals, lead vocals on 2
Craig Gruber – bass, backing vocals
Phil Lynott – bass and lead vocals on track 11 
Ian Paice – drums and percussion on tracks 4-8, 10
Bobby Chouinard – drums  on tracks 1-3, 9
Paul Thompson - drums on track 11
Jimmy Nail – backing vocals on track 10

Production
Tony Platt – producer, mixing at Battery Studios, London, July and August 1984
John Hallett – mixing assistant
Aaron Chakraverty – mastering

Charts

References

1984 live albums
Albums produced by Tony Platt
Gary Moore live albums
Virgin Records live albums